Bud Shank & His Brazilian Friends is an album by saxophonist Bud Shank with pianist/composer João Donato released on the Pacific Jazz label.

Reception

AllMusic rated the album with 3 stars.

Track listing
All compositions by João Donato, except as indicated
 "Sausalito" - 3:53
 "Minha Saudade" (João Donato, João Gilberto) - 3:31
 "Samba do Avião" (Antônio Carlos Jobim) - 3:03
 "It Was Night" (Jobim, Newton Mendonça) - 3:12
 "Silk Stop" - 2:41
 "Caminho de Casa" - 3:20
 "Um Abraco no Bonfa" (Stan Getz,  Gilberto) - 3:15
 "Once I Loved" (Jobim, Vinicius de Moraes) - 4:09
 "Sambou ...Sambou" (Donato, João Mello) - 3:10
 "Tristesa em Mim" (Mauro Tavares, José Gulmaraes) - 3:16

Personnel 
Bud Shank - alto saxophone
João Donato - piano
Rosinha de Valença - guitar
Sebastião Neto - bass
Chico Batera - drums

References 

1965 albums
Bud Shank albums
João Donato albums
Pacific Jazz Records albums